Corridos Al Estilo De Los Caminantes is the fourth studio album by Mexican group Los Caminantes, released in 1984.

Track listing

1984 albums
Los Caminantes albums